Hartinder Dhami better known as H-Dhami is a British-Indian Bhangra artist.

Early life
H-Dhami is the son of Palvinder Dhami, lead singer of the 1980s prominent Bhangra group Heera Group UK. He was born in 1982 to a traditional Sikh Punjabi family.

Career
H-Dhami signed in 2007 to Rishi Rich Productions (RRP), a joint partnership between Rishi Rich and entertainment entrepreneur Waleed Jahangir. H-Dhami has also signed a deal with Sony BMG India for distribution in India.

H-Dhami released his debut album Sadke Java in 2008. It includes collaborations with Roach Killa, Anand Sharma Manu, Chaaya and Mumzy Stranger.

In 2010, H-Dhami was featured on the single "Gereh Kad Dee", the second single from PBN (Panjabi By Nature)'s album Crowd Pleaser. He collaborated with Mumzy Stranger for a Desi-version remix of Stranger's "One More Dance". He also collaborated with the only North-American Bhangra band En Karma on the song "Tere Bina Nahi Nachna". In 2010, he did a Desi mix of Raghav's "So Much" and a remix of Preeya Kalidas' "Shimmy".

In 2019 he won Best Collaboration at Brit Asia TV Music Awards for "Dance", with F1rstman, Juggy D,  Mumzy and Raxstar.

Discography

Albums
2008: Sadke Java

Singles
2007: "Sadke Java"
2008: "Mitran Di Jaan"
2008: "Har Gabroo"
2012: "Tenu Nachdi Vekna" (Music: PBN) (taken from the album The Story So Far)
2016: "Clap It" (PropheC)
2017: "Jaan Kad Di Jaave" (Mumzy)
2018: "Dance" (F1rstman, Juggy D, Raxstar, Mumzy)
2019: "Falling" (Raxstar)

Awards
Won Best Video of Year by Zee TV audience for his debut single "Sadke Java" in 2007.
Won "Best Newcomer" at the 2008 UK Asian Music Awards
Won "Best Male Act" at the 2009 UK Asian Music Awards

References

External links
H-Dhami official website
Interview

Living people
Punjabi-language singers
English people of Indian descent
1982 births